Chukie Edozien (born November 24, 1983), better known by his stage name Lynxxx, is a Nigerian hip-hop recording artist and entrepreneur. In 2010 he released his debut studio album This is Lynxxx and went on to become the first Nigerian artist to be endorsed by the global brand Pepsi. He is the originator of Jollof Musik a genre he describes as "an artful blend of music to create great music".

Early life
Lynxxx is the only son of Chief John D. Edozien, a former deputy governor of old Bendel State in Nigeria. He attended Corona Primary School Ikoyi, Lagos, and went on to study at Kings College Lagos for his secondary education. He attended the University of Hull in the United Kingdom, where he obtained a degree in Business, Economics and Marketing.

Career
After ten years of behind-the-scenes work in the music industry, Lynxxx made his debut as a recording artist in December 2009, with the release of his first official single, "Change your Parade", produced by Syndik8 in-house producer and partner "IKON". The single received a lot of radio airplay and was popular in nightclubs, which helped Lynxxx cultivate a significant fan base through online media.

In December 2010, Lynxxx released his debut album This Is Lynxxx. The album features a combination of musical genres, including urban hip hop, contemporary R&B, and infusions of funky house. Lynxxx calls this combination of different styles "Jollof Musik" - a term that refers to the art of blending various genres to make good music. That same year, Lynxxx became the first Nigerian artist to be endorsed by Pepsi.

In addition to his musical career, Lynxxx is also an entrepreneur. He established several successful businesses prior to his musical career, which include a clothing line called Syndik8 Denim, a digital recording studio called Red Room Studio, a media company called Happy Teddy Media (HTM), and Syndik8 Films.

Discography

Studio albums

Singles

Awards and nominations

References

Nigerian artists
King's College, Lagos alumni
Alumni of the University of Hull
Nigerian hip hop musicians
1983 births
Living people